The 1991–92 season of the Moroccan Throne Cup was the 36th edition of the competition.

Olympique de Casablanca won the cup, beating Raja Club Athletic 1–0 in a final played at the Stade El Harti in Marrakech. Olympique de Casablanca won the competition for the third time in their history.

Competition

Last 16

Quarter-finals

Semi-finals

Final 
The final took place between the two winning semi-finalists, Olympique de Casablanca and Raja Club Athletic, on 11 January 1993 at the Stade El Harti in Marrakech.

Notes and references 

1991
1991 in association football
1992 in association football
1991–92 in Moroccan football